Kevin Joel Lomónaco (born 8 January 2002) is an Argentine professional footballer who plays as a centre-back for Red Bull Bragantino.

Club career
Lomónaco is a product of the Lanús youth system. He made the breakthrough into the club's first-team in 2020, initially appearing in pre-season under manager Luis Zubeldía; notably participating in a friendly against Vélez Sarsfield in October. In November, the centre-back was an unused substitute for a Copa de la Liga Profesional fixture with Newell's Old Boys and a Copa Sudamericana encounter with Bolívar. Lomónaco's senior debut arrived on 13 December against Aldosivi, as he featured for the final four minutes of a 2–1 away win. On 1 September 2021, Lomónaco joined Platense on a loan for the rest of the year. In April 2022, Lomónaco joined Campeonato Brasileiro Série A side Red Bull Bragantino on a five-year deal.

International career
In 2019, Lomónaco represented Argentina at U17 level. After making seven appearances at the South American U-17 Championship in Peru as they won the trophy, he subsequently appeared four times at the FIFA U-17 World Cup in Brazil. He also received a call-up for the 2019 Granatkin Memorial, which they won. In December 2020, Lomónaco was selected to train with the U20s.

Career statistics
.

Honours
Argentina U17
South American U-17 Championship: 2019
Granatkin Memorial: 2019

Notes

References

External links

2002 births
Living people
Footballers from La Plata
Argentine footballers
Argentina youth international footballers
Association football defenders
Argentine Primera División players
Campeonato Brasileiro Série A players
Club Atlético Lanús footballers
Club Atlético Platense footballers
Red Bull Bragantino players
Argentine expatriate footballers
Argentine expatriate sportspeople in Brazil
Expatriate footballers in Brazil